Tekin Bingöl (born 1 August 1955) is a Turkish politician who serves as the Deputy Leader of the Republican People's Party responsible for political organisation since 8 May 2014. He has served as a Member of Parliament for Ankara's second electoral district since 7 June 2015, elected at the June 2015 general election. He previously served as an MP for Ankara's second electoral district between 2007 and 2011.

Early life and career
Tekin Bingöl was born on 1 August 1955 in Bitlis and graduated from Hacettepe University Faculty of Medicine. He became a medical doctor, working in small villages in Bitlis and later becoming a private sector medical practitioner. He was also involved in business administration in the public sector before entering politics. He speaks English at a semi-fluent level, is married and has three children.

Political career
Bingöl was elected as a Member of Parliament for Ankara's second electoral district in the 2007 general election from the Republican People's Party. After the election of Kemal Kılıçdaroğlu as the party's leader during the party's 2010 ordinary convention, Tekin became the Deputy General Secretary of the CHP. He left Parliament at the 2011 general election but continued as a CHP politician, being appointed as the Deputy Leader of the party responsible for political organisation on 8 May 2014. He re-entered Parliament, again as a CHP MP from Ankara's second electoral district at the June 2015 general election, which resulted in a hung parliament.

Interim election cabinet offer
Tekin Bingöl was one of the five CHP politicians who were offered ministerial positions by Justice and Development Party leader Ahmet Davutoğlu in August 2015. Davutoğlu had been tasked by President Recep Tayyip Erdoğan to form an interim election government after coalition negotiations proved unsuccessful and resulted in Erdoğan calling an early election. Since the CHP had 131 MPs during the formation of the interim government, the party was entitled to 5 ministries in the cabinet, though Kılıçdaroğlu announced that the CHP would not take part and give up their five ministries to independent politicians. Bingöl subsequently declined Davutoğlu's offer, as did the four other CHP MPs that had been offered ministerial positions.

References

External links
MP profile on the Grand National Assembly website
Collection of all relevant news items at Haberler.com

Contemporary Republican People's Party (Turkey) politicians
Members of the 25th Parliament of Turkey
Members of the 23rd Parliament of Turkey
1955 births
People from Bitlis
Turkish surgeons
Living people
Hacettepe University alumni
Deputies of Ankara
Members of the 26th Parliament of Turkey